Domestic Import is a 2006 comedy film directed by Kevin Connor and written and produced by Andrea C. Malamut. It stars Cynthia Preston and Larry Dorf. Alla Korot, Howard Hesseman and Mindy Sterling co-star.

Cast
Cynthia Preston as Marsha McMillian
Larry Dorf as David McMillian
Alla Korot as Sophia Petrenko
Mindy Sterling as Bernice Kimmelman
Howard Hesseman as Lou Kimmelman

References

External links
 

2006 films
Films directed by Kevin Connor
2000s English-language films